Pirro Maria Gabrielli (April 1, 1643-19 December 1705) was an Italian physician, residing in his native Siena.

He was a  member of the Signoria of Siena in 1668, the year he received his doctorate in medicine and philosophy.

He initially began studies of logic and philosophy in Siena under A. Venturi Gallerani, but settled to study also medicine. In 1692, he befriended the mathematician Elia Astorini. This combination of interests helped him found in 1691–1692, a scholarly-scientific society known as Fisiocritici with a Lucrezian motto of "Veris quod possit vincere falsa". The entity in a fashion continues to exist today as the Accademia dei Fisiocritici with an associated Natural History museum in Siena.

The group originally met in the library of the Spedale di Santa Maria della Scala. In 1694 the academy moved to the Casa della Sapienza, now the hall of the Biblioteca Comunale degli Intronati belonging to the University of Siena. In 1816 the group moved to the former Camaldolese monastery donated to it by the Grand Duke Ferdinand III, and now serving as a Natural History museum.

In Gabrielli's time, the group also started furthering, however, arcadian fancies and readings. Gabrielli did continue some works on scientific instruments such as a heliometer and a meridian line, and some combined astronomical and astrological observations, including observations about the 1681 comet.

References

1648 births
1705 deaths
17th-century Italian physicians
Italian physicists
People from Siena